Ferjani Sassi (born 18 March 1992) is a Tunisian professional footballer who plays as a midfielder for Al Duhail and the Tunisia national team.

Club career
Sassi started his career with CS Sfaxien where he won the Tunisian League and CAF Confederation Cup in 2013, then he transferred to French club Metz in 2015. In 2018, he went back to Tunisia to join ES Tunis, then he played for Al Nassr in Saudi Arabia, and Zamalek in Egypt.

International career

Sassi played his first international game with the Tunisia senior national team on 8 June 2013, against Sierra Leone (2–2), where he was part of the starting squad and played the entire match.

He was in Tunisia's squad for the 2018 FIFA World Cup in Russia, scoring a penalty in Tunisia's opening game against England. Sassi was also deep in controversy after he tackled England striker Harry Kane in the penalty box which outraged England supporters.

Career statistics

Scores and results list Tunisia's goal tally first, score column indicates score after each Sassi goal.

Honours
CS Sfaxien
Tunisian League: 2013
CAF Confederation Cup: 2013
ES Tunis

Tunisian League: 2017

Zamalek

Egyptian Premier League 2020–21
Saudi-Egyptian Super Cup: 2018
CAF Confederation Cup: 2018–19
Egypt Cup: 2018–19 , 2021
Egyptian Super Cup: 2019–20
CAF Super Cup: 2020

References

External links

1992 births
Living people
People from Aryanah
Tunisian footballers
Tunisian expatriate footballers
Tunisia international footballers
Association football midfielders
2015 Africa Cup of Nations players
2017 Africa Cup of Nations players
CS Sfaxien players
FC Metz players
Espérance Sportive de Tunis players
Al Nassr FC players
Zamalek SC players
Al-Duhail SC players
2018 FIFA World Cup players
Tunisian Ligue Professionnelle 1 players
Ligue 1 players
Saudi Professional League players
Egyptian Premier League players
Qatar Stars League players
Expatriate footballers in France
Expatriate footballers in Saudi Arabia
Expatriate footballers in Egypt
Expatriate footballers in Qatar
Tunisian expatriate sportspeople in France
Tunisian expatriate sportspeople in Saudi Arabia
Tunisian expatriate sportspeople in Egypt
Tunisian expatriate sportspeople in Qatar
2019 Africa Cup of Nations players
Ligue 2 players
2022 FIFA World Cup players